Iraj Gorgin (February 14, 1934 – January 13, 2012) was an Iranian-American radio and television broadcaster and journalist.

Early life 
Iraj Gorgin was born to Mirza Ḥeydar Gorgin and Effat Azima. He graduated from Qarib High School in Shiraz (1952) and received his bachelor's degree in Persian literature from the University of Tehran (1957).

Political influences 
Influenced by his two maternal uncles, Gorgin initially showed interest in the Pan-Iranist Party. However, he gave several lectures to the youth organization of the Tudeh Party of Iran. He did not, however, formally join any political party.

Career 
 Director of News Division of National Iranian Radio and Television Organization (NIRT) 1971–1975
 Director of NIRT Network II, 1975–1979
 Founder and Director of Radio Omid.

Radio and television career 
Gorgin started his journalism career in 1955 as a managing editor of Cultural Kayhan, a weekly magazine of Kayhan national newspaper. In the same year, he joined Radio Iran as a reporter, producer, and news anchor. In 1961 he was appointed as the director of Radio Iran's newly established Radio Tehran. He produced and hosted a program on contemporary Persian poetry program while at National Iranian Radio and Television. His interview with Forough Farrokhzad in 1964 is considered as an exemplary recording of the poet's voice.

Publications

References

External links 
 Remembering Iraj Gorgin | Radio Free Europe/Radio Liberty (English)
 History of Radio; an Interview with Iraj Gorgin (Persian)

2012 deaths
1934 births
People from Tehran
University of Tehran alumni
Iranian emigrants to the United States